Jon Price (born September 28, 1973) is an American sports gambler, adviser, entrepreneur, and radio personality. He placed multiple high-stake sports picks and has been named by The Comeback as "one of the Top 10 Most Influential People in the Sports Betting World."

Life and career 
Price comes from a middle-class family in the Northeast and started to publicly sell tips and picks to the public in 2013 via his sports information traders brand.

Publications 
Price has been featured in a number of publications and nationally syndicated radio shows throughout his career at Sports Information Traders. Forbes Magazine did a feature on him about Super Bowl Prop Bets. He's also been featured on KNBR in San Francisco, ESPN Radio, CBS Sports Radio, and Westwood One with Zach Gelb. and The Gary & Larry Show.

During the 2015-16 College Football Bowl Season, Inc. Magazine did a feature on Price regarding his strategies for wagering on sports, particularly in Bowl Games.

Notable Wagers 
Price won $264,000 by betting the Kansas City Royals would win the World Series in 2015. He also won over $1 million dollars betting the New England Patriots would win the 2015 Super Bowl.

See also
 Sports betting
 Haralabos Voulgaris
 Billy Walters

References

External links
 Sports Information Traders. Retrieved August 19, 2022.

1973 births
American gamblers
Living people
American sports businesspeople